Füsun Önal (born 11 March 1947, Kadıköy, Istanbul, Turkey) is a Turkish pop singer, theatre actress, and writer.

Biography
Önal's father was a soldier in the Turkish army; her mother was a housewife. Füsun grew up in Ankara. During her childhood, she played the mandolin and accordion. She also had private piano lessons, and studied classical music.

Önal graduated from the TED Ankara College and studied English philology at Ankara University. During her college years, she sang with the Erol Pekcan Jazz Orchestra.
Subsequently, she moved to Istanbul and sang pop music in İstanbul's well-known venues. Önal performed at youth concerts, and produced radio and television programs. Additionally, Füsun performed in Australia, England, Italy, Switzerland, Kazakhstan, and Kyrgyzstan; went on 16 tours in Turkey; and acted in numerous voice roles.

Önal was the host of the popular television show Newlywed Game-Evcilik Oyunu for about 450 broadcasts on Turkish TV channel Show TV. She also acted in movies, mainly portraying a singer while performing her own songs. She has played the lead in theatre performances and musicals all over Turkey. Önal has recorded music for CBS, Odeon Records, Sony Records, Discotur, Melody, and Ronnex Records, recording 12 albums to date. She has earned golden records four times: for her songs Senden Başka, Oh Olsun, and Ah Nerede, and her album Alo Ben Füsun. During the 2000s, she released a number of compilation CD's.

Önal is also a photographer, staging 14 personal photograph exhibitions from 1990-2000.

In 1990, Önal began a new career as an author under the patronage of Turkish writer Aziz Nesin. She subsequently signed a contract with Turkish publisher İnkılap Kitapevi.

Currently, Önal performs at the Theatre Kedi, portraying Countess Rosina Almaviva in The Marriage of Figaro.

References
 Who is who database - Biography of Füsun Önal

External links

1947 births
Actresses from Istanbul
Living people
Turkish women singers
Turkish pop singers
Turkish film actresses
Turkish stage actresses
Singers from Istanbul